Arnold Johannessen (15 December 1937 – 27 January 2007) was a Norwegian footballer. He played in three matches for the Norway national football team 1959.

References

External links
 

1937 births
2007 deaths
Norwegian footballers
Norway international footballers
Place of birth missing
Association footballers not categorized by position